Containment is a geopolitical strategy to stop the expansion of an enemy.

Containment may also refer to:

 Containment (computer programming), a form of object composition
 Containment (film), a 2015 British film
 Containment (TV series), a 2016 American series
 Containment building, a structure enclosing a nuclear reactor
 Containment, in set theory, another term for a subset

See also
 Biocontainment
 Container (disambiguation)
 Isolation (disambiguation)
 Contentment (disambiguation)